Rajbiraj is a mid-sized municipality located in the south-eastern part of Madhesh Province of Nepal. Rajbiraj is the district headquarters of Saptari and is the eighth largest city in the province. The township of Rajbiraj was designed in 1938 based on influence from the Indian city of Jaipur - thus making it the first township in Nepal to receive urban planning. City Transferred from old district headquarter Hanumannagar to Rajbiraj. It was declared a municipality in 1959. According to the 2011 census, the city had a population of 37,738 but the latest population is estimated to be 69,803 making it the 33rd largest municipality in Nepal.

The city is named after the ancient temple of Rajdevi, rebuilt by the Sena kings in the early 14th century. Rajbiraj has prominently served as a politically active town in the modern history of Nepal and has been the hometown to a number of icons of the nation. Rajbiraj comes under the Saptari 2(B) assembly constituency which elects a member to the Provincial Assembly of Madhesh Province once every five years and it is a part of the Saptari 2 constituency which elects its MP once in five years.

Roadways are the major mode of transportation to the town but it also has air connectivity.

Rastriya Janata Party Nepal's Shambhu Prasad Yadav and Sadhana Jha hold the current mayoral and deputy mayoral chairs of the town, as per the results of the local elections held on 27 September 2018.

History

Ancient Era
The city is part of the Mithila region which was an ancient kingdom which rose to prominence under King Janaka ( 8th-7th centuries BCE). The city is historical twin city of Janakpur also known to be a seat of Kushadhwaja the brother of King Janka whose 3 daughters Mandavi, Urmila and Shrutakirti were married to Bharata, Lakshmana and Shatrughna. Kushadhwaja later ruled the area through his ministers and moved to Sankadya. During the Medieval Period around 520 CE, King Salahesh reigned over Mithila region and made his capital near Lahan, 35 km west to Rajbiraj. The most powerful and prominent kingdom, Karnat dynasty comes into power and ruled Mithila (also known as Tirhut) from 11th century to early 14th century. The fifth King of karnat dynasty, Shaktisingh Dev (r. 1285 to 1295 CE) was travelled through this region after transferring his supremacy to his younger son Harisimhadeva and built the famous and ancient Chinnamasta Bhagawati Mandir as well as his fort nearby the temple, which is known as Gadhi Gaachhi locally. After the fall of Karnat dynasty, the Sena dynasty which was entered in Mithila, through Rupnagar from Bengal around early 13th century started ruling this region from 15th century to 18th century. The Rajdevi Temple was rebuilt by Sena king in early 14th century and also known to be family temple of Kushadhwaja. Within the periphery of Rajbiraj there were small shrines dedicated to Mandavi, Urmila and Shrutakirti but have lost with time.

Modern Era
After the Treaty of Sugauli in 1816 the region become part of Kingdom of Nepal. Rajbiraj is one of the few cities given the status of municipality when Nepal's monarchy was restored in the 1950s. Rajbiraj is the first city of Nepal to be urban planned. The Nepal government plans to develop it as a model city. Chief Engineer and Architect Dilli Jang Thapa designed Rajbiraj based on Indian city Jaipur. The city is now recognized as an educational capital of Eastern Nepal with various schools and colleges opening.

Toponymy
The city of Rajbiraj is named after Rajdevi Temple. The Meaning of Raj comes from the name of the Rajdevi temple which means "state" and biraj means "to reside" or "to live".

Demography 
According to the National Population Census of 2011, Rajbiraj's population was 37,738, of which male and female are 19,684 and 18,054 respectively. The effective literacy rate was 79.71%, with male literacy at 88.40% and female literacy at 70.24%. The data on religion in 2011 showed Hinduism as the majority religion. Most people follow Hinduism as a religion. The Hindu population accounts for 87%, Muslim 10.89%, Jains 1.26% and Sikhs 0.64%. The city has also community of Muslims along with Sikhs, Jains and Buddhists. Rajbiraj is situated within one of the most ethnically diverse regions of Nepal, and the rural hinterland is home to a diverse cross section of Terai communities consisting of Kayastha, Deo, Yadav, Mandal, Muslim, Brahmin, Rajput, Marwari, Tharu, Badhai, Lohar, Sonar, Teli, Bania, Damai, Newar and Bahun.

Transport

Road
It is well connected to other Nepalese cities by National Highway and Sub Highway. Buses are an important mode of intercity passenger travel. Besides that, electric rickshaws and microvans are another important means of traveling in local areas.

Air

Rajbiraj has one of the oldest airfields of Nepal, named as the Rajbiraj Airport (IATA: RJB, ICAO: VNRB) which was inaugurated by the then transportation minister Ganesh Man Singh in 1959. After witnessing almost three decades of halt, the Civil Aviation Authority of Nepal carried out a series of vigorous renovation (worth Rs. 303 million) of the airport in the 1990s but the flights again had to be stopped in 2007. Shree Airlines 50-seater CRJ-200 was tested on 23 May 2018 with Captain DR Niroula of Shree's safety department along with other instructor pilots — Captain Prajwol Adhikari, Rajesh Shrestha. The halted flights of the airport were subsequently resumed from first 24 June 2018. As of February 2020, Buddha air aims to run daily flights in between Rajbiraj and Kathmandu.

Intracity
The best way of getting around the city is by using cycle rickshaws and electric rickshaws. There are also auto rickshaw  running short distances but they don't operate in the main market area.

Climate
Rajbiraj Municipal has particularly a tropical climate. The three main seasons, summer, monsoon and winter respectively. Being located in the Plain (Terai) lands of Nepal, the climate and weather of Rajbiraj is usually hot. The summer season runs from Early April to August and touches temperature ranging from 23 °C (73 °F) to 44 °C (111 °F). Monsoons arrive in the month of July heralded by dust and thunderstorms. The winter season prevails from the month of October till the month of March. Humidity, which prevails during monsoons, diminishes at the arrival of winters. The city observes pleasant sunny days and enjoyable cool nights with the temperature ranging from 6 °C (41 °F) to 30 °C (86 °F).

Rajbiraj winter season is the most appealing time to pay here a visit. Tourists arrive in large numbers, anytime between mid-September to late March or early April. Overall the January is the coldest month and June is the most hottest month in the year.

Tourism 
Rajbiraj is famous for agricultural products, spices and handicrafts. Mithila Paintings and Maithili culture is the main part of tourism to be explored. There are many religious Hindu temples to visit. Some of them are more than 2000 years old. The Koshi Tappu Wildlife Reserve famous for its wildlife is just 40-minute drive from the city.
The Koshi Barrage is also the attraction which is only 25 km far from the city. The nearest inner-madhesh part includes Dharan (75 km) and Gaighat (60 km) far.

Culture

Attire
The females are usually seen in the salwaar kameez and women are seen in the sarees. Males usually wear western garments like pants, shirts and T-shirts, rather than the traditional dhoti and kurtas, although males often wear traditional dress during Puja and festivals. Females are also gradually taking up more and more Western wear, with variety of jeans in the streets. There are less number of girls seen wearing T-skirts and Miniskirts predominating in the private schools, colleges and campuses. Younger females also seen wearing Lehenga in special occasion like wedding ceremony and festivals.

Religious Sites

Rajdevi Temple is a historic pre 14th century Hindu temple located on the east of the city and is one of the most prominent landmarks of the city. It is dedicated to the deity Rajdevi. The temple is a significant symbol for Hindus and the present structure was built between 1990.
There are other Hindu temples in the city like Bhagwati Temple, Bageshwari Temple, Shree Radha Krishna Temple, Baishnavi Kali Mandir, Thangachi Mandir, Chitragupta Mandir where devotees come to offer prayer every day.

There is a Noori Jaama Masjid in the eastern central part of the town where Muslims congregate to perform Salat al-Jumu'ah.

Architecture 

The city was planned after the then headquarter of Saptari district Hanumannagar, which was heavily affected by the Saptakoshi river floods. In 1938–39, Baber Shamsher Jang Bahadur Rana, then head of the eastern command and his representative then Governor (Badahakim) Prakasha Shamser JB Rana justifies and approved Rajbiraj as the headquarter of Saptari district. Rajbiraj city was systematically designed based on the Indian city Jaipur by then chief architect and engineer Dilli Jung Thapa in 60 Bigha of land. 
There was dense jungle where fox roared before the proper inhabited took place. In 1941, the city gained the status of the headquarter of Saptari district and fully operational for inhabitant. Initially, the city was planned in 60 bigha of land but later 10 bigha of land was added to northern side for government office (Kachahari line) and 8 bigha of land in southern side was added to the city for the officials resident area (Swarna tol) making it in total 78 bigha of land. A small alley behind each of the four houses,
Chauk square at the junction of main road and auxiliary road, grocery stores, vegetable market lines and government office buildings have been arranged in proper manner making it first planned city of Nepal.

Festivals
Major religious celebrations include the major Hindu festivals Vijaya Dashami, Dipawali, Chhath, Holi, Sama Chakeva and Vishwakarma Puja. The Chhath and Holi is heavily celebrated with a carnival-like atmosphere. The locals people take pride in the way these festivals are celebrated.

Cuisines 
The staple diet of the region is rice, roti, achar, chatni, dal, saag, paneer, maachh, mutton and curry. On the festive occasions, people prepare a number of fried items of vegetables, locally known as Tarua as well as other special items. The local Maithili cuisine comprises a broad repertoire of rice, wheat, fish and meat dishes and the skilled use of various spices. The popular dishes includes Kadhi bari, Palak paneer, Khichdi, Aloo mutter, Dum Aloo, Mutton/Chicken Biryani and the desserts Khaja, Jalebi, Malpua, Rabri, Kheer, Thekua, Laddu and Gulab Jamun.

The commons dishes of the city is influenced with Maithil cuisine, Nepalese cuisine and Indian cuisine. Bagiya, Murhee ke laai, litti are also popular among people. Street foods such as Samosa, Chaat, Panipuri, Chow mein, Momo, Omelette and Sekuwa are favourite among Rajbirajians.

Languages

The most commonly and widely speaking language of the city is Maithili. After Maithili, Nepali is also well understood and widely used for business and administrative purposes.
Hindi is widely used by people from madhesh as a link language along with Marwari people and migrant workers from India.
Historically, Rajbiraj was considered one of the great center of Mithila culture.

Media 
Print media include the National daily  Annapurna Post, Gorkhapatra, Kantipur Patrika and Nepal Samacharpatra. There are numerous local newspaper which covers the news of the city like Nai Ummid, Rajbiraj Dainik, Krishna Dainik, News Today Patrika and Green Madhesh Patrika. while English news daily like The Himalayan Times and The Kathmandu Post are also available.

Telecommunications services include Nepal Telecom, Ncell, Smart Cell and UTL Nepal. WorldLink, Broadlink and Subisu are providing broadband services in this region. To promote local culture, Rajbiraj has number of FM radio stations which are:

 Bhorukuwa FM
 Chhinnamasta/Apan FM
 C FM
 Radio Chandrama FM
 Jai Madhesh FM
 Appan FM

Educational institutions

Rajbiraj has a well-established education infrastructure. There are a number of colleges and schools meeting the requirements of not only the city but the region and country as well. It is home to several Educational institutions for pre-primary, Primary, Secondary, High-Secondary, senior-secondary, graduate and post-graduate studies. Rajbiraj is an educational hub of Eastern Region of Nepal. Sai Krishna Medical College & Hospital (SKMCH), nursing colleges & +2 colleges in the city are attracting the student from neighbor district & Eastern Region of Nepal.

Hospitals
Following health services are available at Rajbiraj.
 Sagaramatha Zonal Hospital Gajendra Nr Singh Hospital 
 Unique College of Medical Science and Hospital
 Sagarmatha Chaudhary Eye Hospital
 Ram Raja Prasad Singh Academy of Health Sciences
 Chhinnamasta Hospital
 Anar Bhupendra Hospital

Sports
Kabaddi and Cricket are the most popular sports among the younger generation in the city. The city has 3 local stadiums. The sporting activities are mainly centered in the multipurpose stadium Raj Rangasala in the main city. The popular sports are cricket, football, volleyball, basketball, kabaddi, badminton etc. Freedom cricket club and Rajdevi cricket academy are the most active cricket club in the city. Mahendra Club is one of the most active organizations promoting football in the city and organizes a regional club-level football tournament: the Saptari Gold Cup.

Notable persons 
 
 
 Mehboob Alam, Nepalese cricket player Cricket Association of Nepal, first bowler to take all ten wickets in an innings in an International Cricket Council tournament.
 Upendra Yadav, Founder of Federal Socialist Forum Nepal, Ex foreign minister of Nepal and Ex Health and Population minister
 Dipendra Chaudhary, former Nepalese cricket player
 Parmanand Jha, first Vice President of Nepal and ex Supreme Court Judge
 C. K. Raut, president of newly formed Janamat Party
 Gajendra Narayan Singh, Founder of Nepal Sadbhawana Party Nepal
 Ram Raja Prasad Singh, Politician

See also 
 List of educational institutions in Rajbiraj

References

External links

Populated places in Saptari District
Transit and customs posts along the India–Nepal border
Populated places in Mithila, Nepal
Nepal municipalities established in 1959
Municipalities in Madhesh Province